Johann Conrad Weiser may refer to:

Conrad Weiser (1696–1760), Pennsylvanian pioneer, interpreter and diplomat
Johann Conrad Weiser, Sr. (1662–1746), his father, German Palatine